Shadow of the Cloak was a spy drama live television series broadcast on the now-defunct DuMont Television Network. Helmut Dantine played secret agent Peter House. John Gay wrote some of the 36 episodes.

The first episode aired June 6, 1951, and the last episode March 20, 1952. The 30-minute show aired Wednesdays at 9:30 p.m. ET through November 1951 and then Thursdays at 9 p.m. ET from December until March 20, 1952. From January 1952 until the end of the run, Shadow of the Cloak alternated with Gruen Playhouse.

Preservation status
One episode, "The Last Performance" (aired January 10, 1952), written by Rod Serling, is known to have survived.

See also
 List of programs broadcast by the DuMont Television Network
 List of surviving DuMont Television Network broadcasts
 1951–52 United States network television schedule

Citations

General bibliography 
 Brooks, Tim, and Earle Marsh, The Complete Directory to Prime Time Network TV Shows, Third edition (New York: Ballantine Books, 1964) 
 McNeil, Alex. Total Television, Fourth edition (New York: Penguin Books, 1980) 
 Weinstein, David. The Forgotten Network: DuMont and the Birth of American Television (Philadelphia: Temple University Press, 2004)

External links
 
 List of episodes at CTVA
 DuMont Television Network Historical Web Site

1951 American television series debuts
1952 American television series endings
1950s American drama television series
American live television series
Black-and-white American television shows
DuMont Television Network original programming
English-language television shows
Espionage television series
Lost television shows